The Chevrolet TrailBlazer (also known as Trailblazer) is a mid-size SUV produced by Chevrolet, a division of General Motors. The nameplate was first used in North America from 2001 to 2008; in 2009 it was replaced by the Traverse, as a crossover SUV. In 2011, a production of a newly redesigned version of the Trailblazer for Asia and Brazil began.



Blazer trim line (1998) 

The TrailBlazer name was first introduced for the 1999 model year as an upscale trim level of the compact 4-door Chevrolet S-10 Blazer. It offered additional features on top of the previously top-of-the-line Chevrolet S-10 Blazer LT trim level, including an AM/FM stereo with single-disc CD player and optional remote cassette player, OnStar, color-keyed front and rear bumpers, side cladding, a leather-wrapped steering wheel, upgraded alloy wheels, a full-size spare tire and wheel, and upgraded cloth seating surfaces with power front bucket seats. Options such as a Bose premium sound system, leather-trimmed seating surfaces with heated front seats, power sunroof, and gold accents for the exterior emblems were all available for the original TrailBlazer trim package. The TrailBlazer trim was discontinued after 2001, when an all-new TrailBlazer model was introduced as a mid-size SUV. Production of the compact S-10 Blazer overlapped until the 2005 model year.

First generation (KC; 2001) 

The first generation 2002–2009 TrailBlazer is based on a truck platform officially known as GMT360, with all models having four-wheel-drive layout  as an option with both automatic engagement and the more traditional "2 High", "Automatic", "4 High" and "4 Low" gearing's, except the SS model which features an all-wheel-drive system. The TrailBlazer features an independent front suspension, and a five-link rear suspension. A G80 locking rear differential is available as an option on all models except for the SS which has a G86 LSD as standard. An LTZ trim level had upgraded interior features (leather), upgraded sound system (Bose), and alloy wheels. All TrailBlazers came factory equipped with a detachable towing hitch.

 

The TrailBlazer was updated in 2005 for the 2006 model year. An updated front fascia on models higher than the base version and new interior trim were included with the refresh. The SS gets trim-specific front and rear fascias plus color-matched side skirts.

Engines 
LH6 5.3L V8s came standard with Active Fuel Management. The inline-six engine option made the TrailBlazer the most powerful six-cylinder SUV in its class at the time of production. The Active Fuel Management system on the LH6 5.3L V8 engine shuts off 4 of the 8 cylinders during highway travel and idle to save fuel.

The TrailBlazer won the North American Truck of the Year award in 2002. The 4.2 L engine appeared on the Ward's 10 Best Engines list from 2002–2005 with innovative features such as DOHC, variable valve timing on the exhaust camshaft and GM's patented lost-foam casting process.

 2002–2009 LL8 4.2 L I6
 2003–2004 LM4 5.3 L V8
 2005–2009 LH6 5.3 L V8
 2006–2009 LS2 6.0 L V8

Trim levels 

Throughout its production run, the TrailBlazer was available in several different trim levels:

The LS was the base trim level of the TrailBlazer, and included a plentiful amount of standard equipment, including aluminum-alloy wheels, four wheel disc brakes, the 4.2L Vortec Inline Six-Cylinder (I6) gasoline engine, a four-speed automatic transmission, cloth seating surfaces, a full-size, matching spare tire with black-painted steel spare wheel, an A/M-F/M stereo with single-disc CD player, a six-speaker audio system, power windows, door locks, and mirrors, keyless entry, a 65/35 split-folding rear bench seat, dual zone climate control, cruise control and a Driver's Information Center,. Optional features included a combination cassette and single-disc CD player or a six-disc CD player, a power front driver's seat, a security system, satellite radio (later models) and OnStar.

The LT was the midlevel trim of the TrailBlazer, and added further convenience items to the base LS trim, including upgraded aluminum-alloy wheels, a power front driver's seat, a security system, and a leather-wrapped steering wheel. Optional features included a Bose six-speaker premium amplified audio system, a combination cassette and single-disc CD player or a six-disc, in-dash CD changer, luxury leather-trimmed seating surfaces, dual heated front bucket seats, a power front passenger's seat, a driver's memory system for front driver's seat, mirrors, and radio preset settings, a power moonroof, a rear DVD entertainment system by Panasonic (newer models), polished aluminum-alloy wheels, OnStar, a touchscreen GPS navigational radio (later models), and a universal garage door opener system with travel note recorder.

The LTZ was the top-of-the-line trim level of the TrailBlazer, and added further luxury features to the already well-equipped LT trim, including a Bose six-speaker premium amplified audio system, a six-disc, in-dash CD changer, luxury leather-trimmed seating surfaces, dual heated front bucket seats, OnStar, a universal garage door opener system with travel note recorder, a power moonroof, and upgraded interior trim. Additional options included polished aluminum-alloy wheels, a touchscreen GPS navigational radio (later models) and a rear DVD entertainment system by Panasonic. This trim was only offered for the 2002 and 2003 model years.

The SS, introduced for the 2006 model year, was the performance-oriented model of the TrailBlazer, and was based on either the LS or LT trim, depending on the equipment package selected (see the specific models above for standard and optional equipment, which is identical to those trim levels). The differences included unique interior trim, unique polished aluminum-alloy wheels, a unique leather-wrapped steering wheel with an "SS" center emblem, "SS" emblems on the polished wheel center caps, "SS" embroidery for both front bucket seats, unique premium cloth or luxury leather-trimmed seating surfaces, and a 6.0L V8 gasoline engine taken from the Chevrolet Corvette (C6).

EXT 

The TrailBlazer was also available as a 3-row, 7-passenger EXT version. This vehicle was  longer and had a higher roofline in the rear to allow easier access to the third row of seats. Chevrolet disguised the higher roofline using roof racks. The TrailBlazer EXT platform was given the internal designation GMT370, which was shared with the GMC Envoy XL and Isuzu Ascender LWB; long wheelbase versions of the Oldsmobile Bravada, Buick Rainier and Saab 9-7X were never offered.

Production of the EXT model was handled by the Oklahoma City Assembly plant in Oklahoma City, Oklahoma. The last TrailBlazer EXT rolled off the assembly line on February 20, 2006, because GM had reportedly closed that plant, making 2006 the final year for the TrailBlazer EXT.

The EXT could be identified by its much straighter rear doors (which were not inline with the rear wheel arches), as well as by the circular, metal cap on each of the quarter windows where the opening mechanism attaches, on the 2003 models only.

SS 

An SS model was introduced for the 2006 model year. This was the first time a production SUV wore the Super Sport badge. The TrailBlazer SS came standard with a 6.0L LS2 V8 engine which produced 395 bhp and 400lb-ft (540 nm) of torque, the same standard engine as the 2005–2007 C6 Corvette, except with different exhaust (more restrictive) and a taller intake manifold to better use the torque characteristics of the engine in the much heavier body. All TrailBlazers SS also came from the factory with 4.10 differentials, improving off-the-line acceleration. They were available in both rear-wheel-drive and all-wheel-drive configurations. About 1.7% of total TrailBlazer production had the B4U SS-package.

Safety 
IIHS tests in early 2009 gave early TrailBlazers a Acceptable overall rating in the frontal offset test while 2005–2009 models got an Acceptable rating.  For 2008 models side curtain airbags became standard. At that time, the TrailBlazer received a Marginal overall side impact rating - tested with optional side airbags present.  Torso type side airbags were not available then.

2007 National Highway Traffic Safety Administration (NHTSA) Crash Test Ratings:

 Frontal Driver: 
 Frontal Passenger: 
 Side Driver: 
 Side Rear Passenger: 
 Rollover 2wd: 
 Rollover 4wd:

Yearly American sales

Discontinuation 
The next generation TrailBlazer was to be built on an upgraded version of the current GMT360 platform called the GMT361. It was scheduled to be launched in spring 2007, but in January 2006, GM decided to refresh the current platform and call the vehicle a GMT360NG. However, in June 2006, GM announced that the GMT360NG program was also canceled due to the large investment. GM decided to keep the current TrailBlazer until the 2009 model year (2008 in Mexico).

Buick instead got the Enclave, a GM Lambda platform-based crossover SUV to replace the Rainier (along with the Rendezvous and the Terraza minivan), while GMC got the GM Theta platform-based crossover SUV Terrain to replace the Envoy. Saab replaced the 9-7X with the Cadillac SRX-based 9-4X, which was discontinued soon after its introduction.

The TrailBlazer was replaced by the Traverse in 2009. GM had closed the Moraine plant on December 23, 2008, ending production of all GMT360 products. The last TrailBlazer rolled off the Moraine line on December 16, 2008, a week before the plant's closure.  The closing of the last factory that manufactured the trucks was the subject of a 2009 HBO documentary The Last Truck: Closing of a GM Plant.

Recall 
In 2012, General Motors and Isuzu recalled more than 258,000 SUVs in the U.S. and Canada to fix short-circuits in power window and door lock switches that could cause fires. The recall covered TrailBlazer, Envoy, Rainier, Ascender and 9-7X SUVs from the 2006 and 2007 model years. The SUVs were sold or registered in 20 U.S. states, Washington, D.C., and Canada, where salt and other chemicals are used to clear roads in the winter.

Second generation (RG; 2011)  

The second generation (stylised as Trailblazer instead of TrailBlazer) was unveiled as a concept at the 2011 Dubai Motor Show, and as a production model at the Bangkok Motor Show on March 21, 2012. As is the case with the original K5 Blazer (1969–1994), Tahoe (since 1995), Suburban (since 1935) and S-10 Blazer (1983–2005), the second-generation Trailblazer is based on a truck frame, namely the second generation Colorado. The bodywork from the A-pillar back is entirely different as it takes the form of an SUV with an enclosed roof, tailgate and three rows of seats. Unlike the Colorado, the rear suspension is a five-link system connected to coil springs but retains the live axle.

The second generation Trailblazer is built in Thailand and in Brazil. It was also sold in some of the Southeast Asian countries, India, South Africa, Middle East and sold in Australia as the Holden Colorado 7 from 2012 to 2016, and being rebadged as the Trailblazer in 2017. The first-generation Isuzu MU-X also shared the platform with the second-generation Trailblazer.

Engines 

The 2.8 L diesel engine have several new parts, namely a new water-cooled variable-geometry turbocharger, a new high-pressure common-rail fuel delivery system, a new exhaust gas recirculation (EGR) system, a new intake manifold, a new cylinder head, a new cylinder block, a new balance shaft unit and a new Engine Control Module (ECM).

Holden Colorado 7/Trailblazer 

The Trailblazer was sold in Australia since 2012 as the Holden Colorado 7. The range consists of two trim levels; LT and LTZ. Standard equipment for all Colorado 7s includes cruise control, body-coloured bumpers, side steps, front fog lights, aluminium roof rails, rear parking sensors (in addition to the rear camera), Bluetooth phone connectivity, USB input, roof mounted climate control vents for second and third rows and a leather-wrapped steering wheel with multifunction controls. The LTZ adds 18-inch wheels, projector headlights, exterior chrome highlights, leather seats, a premium sounds system, a six-way adjustable driver's seat, higher grade interior trim elements and LED tail-lights. The Colorado 7 is powered by the same VM Motori 2.8 L turbo-diesel engine as the Colorado.

At its first model update in 2016, the Colorado 7 was renamed to Trailblazer.

Sales

References

External links 

 
 Official website (Thailand)
 Official website (Indonesia)
 
 GMTNation: Chevrolet TrailBlazer & GMC Envoy Help Resource Site

Trailblazer (SUV)
Cars introduced in 2001
2010s cars
2020s cars
Mid-size sport utility vehicles
Rear-wheel-drive vehicles
All-wheel-drive vehicles
Motor vehicles manufactured in the United States
Cars of Brazil
Latin NCAP large off-road